Jamabrud Rural District is in the Central District of Damavand County, Tehran province, Iran. The capital is Absard, which as a city is not part of the rural district. At the National Census of 2006, its population was 4,773 in 1,476 households. There were 4,878 inhabitants in 1,498 households at the following census of 2011. At the most recent census of 2016, the population of the rural district was 4,635 in 1,544 households. The largest of its 73 villages was Vadan, with 1,305 people.

References 

Damavand County

Rural Districts of Tehran Province

Populated places in Tehran Province

Populated places in Damavand County